The Gambia is a Muslim majority country, with Muslims constituting 96.4% of the population, some 3.5% are Christian, and 0.1% practice other religions (including African Traditional Religions).

Legal regulations
Articles 17, 25, 32, 33, and 212 of the Constitution guarantee and protects the freedom of religion.

Article 60 of the constitution prohibits forming political parties that are formed on a religious basis.

Government meetings and events typically commence with two prayers, one Islamic and one Christian. The government often invites senior officials of both religious groups to open major government events with prayers. The president, a Muslim, delivers a Christmas message to the nation each year and also delivers messages for major Muslim feasts.

The government does not require religious groups to register. Faith-based nongovernmental organizations (NGOs) must meet the same registration and licensing requirements as other NGOs.

Islam
According to the CIA World Factbook, Muslims constitute 96.4 percent of the population. The vast majority are Sunnis influenced by Sufism. The main Sufi orders represented are Tijaniyah and Qadiriyah. Sufi orders pray together at common mosques. A small percentage of Muslims, predominantly immigrants from South Asia, do not ascribe to any traditional Islamic school of thought.

Islam and state
The Supreme Islamic Council is an independent body that advises the government on religious issues. Although not represented on the council, the government provides the council with substantial funding. The country's president serves as the minister of religious affairs and maintains a formal relationship with the council.

The constitution establishes Qadi courts, with Muslim judges trained in the Islamic legal tradition, in specific areas that the chief justice determines. The Qadi courts are located in each of the country's seven regions and apply sharia law. Their jurisdiction applies only to marriage, divorce, custody over children, and inheritance questions for Muslims.

Non-Qadi district tribunals, which deal with issues under the customary and traditional law, apply sharia, if relevant when presiding over cases involving Muslims. A five-member Qadi panel has purview over appeals regarding decisions of the Qadi courts and non-Qadi district tribunals relating to sharia.

Ahmadiyya
Among the immigrants from South Asia there are also followers of the Ahmadiyya faith. The Ahmadis do not pray together with Sufis in Sufi mosques.

Christianity
A significant minority, estimated 3.5% of the population, is Christian. The Christian community, situated mostly in the west and south of the country, is predominantly Roman Catholic; there are also several Protestant groups including Anglicans, Methodists, Baptists, Seventh-day Adventists, and various small evangelical denominations.

Foreign missionary groups operate in the country.

Hinduism
There is a small group of Hindus among the South Asian community.

According to ARDA, Gambia had 0.02% Hindus in 2020.

Regulation of interfaith marriage
Intermarriage between Muslims and Christians is common. Sharia law applies to interfaith couples where the Muslim spouse is the husband.

Traditional religions and syncretism

Less than 1 percent practice traditional African religion. In some areas, Islam and Christianity are syncretized with traditional African religion, such as the Serer religion. Christians also syncretize Christianity with the old Traditional African religion.

Other
There is a small group of followers of the Baháʼí Faith among South Asian immigrants. There are few atheists in the country.

Religion and ethnicity

Faith practices outside codified Islam

Female genital mutilation
Female genital mutilation (FGM) is a practice that is prevalent in many African countries and has sparked various debates around religion and tradition/culture. FGM as a rite of passage is practiced heavily in the Gambia; about  75% of the population indulges in it, mainly affecting young girls before they reach 18. It is the ritual cutting or removal of some or all of the external female genitalia. This is a pre-Islamic practice, but many use the Qu'ran to justify it, stating that Allah has vindicated it. Nevertheless, out of the eight ethnic groups, seven engage in the practice. It is a practice that is believed to ensure premarital virginity and marital fidelity. The World Health Organization (WHO) has recognized it as a violation of the human rights of young girls and women. In 2015 former  President Jammeh banned FGM, ordering anyone who was caught performing would be sentenced to jail; however, there is no law stating that it has been officially banned.

Animism
Although Islam is a monotheistic religion, many ethnic tribes in the Gambia are practitioners of animism and have faith in other gods. The practice of wearing Jujus around the waist is a common feature among ethnic groups. Jujus are charms that are believed to have magical or supernatural powers. Many wear them as protection or good luck charms against any evil. Gambian wrestlers, soccer players, artists are known for wearing Juju waistbands. The Juju waistbands are mostly Qur'anic inscriptions prescribed by Marabouts enclosed in leather pouches; in the Mandinka language, they are called Safou. Marabouts can be Islamic teachers, fortune tellers, shamans, or spiritual guides. People seek advice from them to obtain any form of good fortune and luck. The local herbalists/marabout make these Juju waistbands to protect people from evil and improve their status. This is a taboo belief that Islam does not tolerate. In Surah 2, verse 163, it states that your  God is one God! There is no god but He; however, many ethnic tribes are highly involved in Juju work and belief.

Praying at "sacred sites"
Though it goes against Islamic tradition, many Gambians will pray at sacred sites where holy men frequently pray to seek Allah's blessing. Places such as crocodile pools, ancient trees, and burial sites are familiar places where Gambia Muslims seek prayer answers despite it being against the Islamic Code. The most common sacred sites are in Bakau Kachikally (the Kachikally Museum and Crocodile Pool), and Kartong Folonko. People frequently visit these sites for various reasons, such as seeking blessing for a promotion at work and praying for their children. Women who cannot have children often visit these sites to seek Allah's blessing in the hopes they will conceive.

Death-related superstitions (late-night calls)
Late-night calls are the calling of someone's name at night. Many communities believe that calling a person's name at night comes from owls announcing the community's pending death. Owls in many ethnic tribes are seen as evil; thus, tribe elders advise members never to answer late-night calls. This belief is taboo in Islam because Muslims believe that death comes from Allah, not from night creatures. As seen in Surah 44, verse 8 of the Qu'ran, it states that  death only comes from the creator.

See also

Demographics of the Gambia
Islam in the Gambia
Christianity in the Gambia
Serer religion
Serer creation myth
Religion in Senegal

References